Nikola Vukčević may refer to:

Nikola Vukčević (film director) (born 1974), Montenegrin film director
Nikola Vukčević (historian) (died 1982), Montenegrin historian and ethnologist
Nikola Vukčević (footballer, born 1984), Montenegrin international footballer
Nikola Vukčević (footballer, born 1991), Montenegrin international footballer
Nikola Vukčević (water polo) (born 1985), Montenegrin water polo player

See also  
 Nikola Vučević
 Nikolina Vukčević
 Vukčević